The Cavalry and Guards Club is a London gentlemen's club, at 127 Piccadilly, situated next to the RAF Club.

History
The club has three foundation dates:
1810, the foundation date of the Guards Club, which was based in Pall Mall.
1890, the foundation date of the Cavalry Club, which has always been based at its current location.
1975, the date when the two clubs merged.

When the Cavalry Club first occupied the site in 1890, it was a proprietary club owned by an officer in the 20th Hussars, but five years later, ownership passed into the hands of its members and it became a members' club. They raised the funds to build an entirely new clubhouse, which was completed on the site in 1908. The work was carried out by the architect's firm Mewes and Davies.

Edward VIII was known to spend a great deal of time in the Cavalry Club premises in the 1920s and 1930s, when he was Prince of Wales.  King Abdullah of Jordan, the Sultan of Brunei and Prince William have also been members.

The club narrowly avoided closure in 1987, when its landlord sold the premises on to a property developer, who planned to convert the building into apartments. This was averted through the membership raising the capital to buy the property for the club.

See also
List of gentlemen's clubs in London

References

External links
The Cavalry and Guards Club website

Gentlemen's clubs in London
1976 establishments in the United Kingdom
Guards Division (United Kingdom)
Organizations established in 1976
Piccadilly
Military gentlemen's clubs